Antoni Stychel (1859–1935) was a Polish priest, member of parliament, president of the Union of the Catholic Societies of Polish Workers (Związek Katolickich Towarzystw Robotników Polskich). He was one of the pioneers of the Catholic social movement in  Poland.

References 

 Witold Jakóbczyk, Przetrwać na Wartą 1815-1914, Dzieje narodu i państwa polskiego, vol. III-55, Krajowa Agencja Wydawnicza, Warszawa 1989
 http://daten.digitale-sammlungen.de/~db/bsb00003459/images/index.html?nativeno=385

1859 births
1935 deaths
People from Międzyrzecz County
People from the Province of Posen
Polish Roman Catholic priests
Polish Party politicians
National League (Poland) members
National Party (Poland) politicians
Members of the 12th Reichstag of the German Empire
Members of the 13th Reichstag of the German Empire
Members of the Legislative Sejm of the Second Polish Republic
Senators of the Second Polish Republic (1922–1927)
Catholic clergy of the Prussian partition
Polish deputies to the Reichstag in Berlin
Member of the Tomasz Zan Society